Walter William Robbins (24 November 1910 –1979) was a Welsh professional footballer and Wales international.

Club career

Having previously worked for a local brewery, Robbins was serving a motor engineering apprenticeship when he rose to attention after scoring 70 goals during a single season for Ely United in the Cardiff and District League at the age of 16. He signed for Cardiff City, making his debut during the 1928–29 season against Portsmouth before scoring his first goal for the club in his next game, a 1–1 draw with Bolton Wanderers. Relegation to Division Two saw the departures of George McLachlan and Fred Warren during the following season, handing Robbins a regular first team place. On 6 February 1932, Robbins scored five goals during a 9–2 win over Thames, which remains the club's record league win. Several months later, Robbins was sold to West Bromwich Albion where he spent 8 years before the outbreak of World War II.

International career

In 1929, Robbins was selected for the Football Association of Wales tour of Canada but these matches were not classed as international cap matches. His Cardiff City teammates Len Davies, Fred Keenor and Fred Warren were also selected for the tour. He made his full debut for Wales on 25 October 1930 in a 1–1 draw with Scotland.

International goals
Results list Wales' goal tally first.

After retirement

Following the end of World War II, Robbins worked as a trainer with Cardiff City and Newport County. After his coaching career he moved to manchester united as a scout.

References

1910 births
1979 deaths
Footballers from Cardiff
Welsh footballers
Wales international footballers
Cardiff City F.C. players
West Bromwich Albion F.C. players
English Football League players
Association football forwards